Kim Ye-jun (born April 28, 2007), is a South Korean child actor. He is known for his roles in Misaeng: Incomplete Life, Weightlifting Fairy Kim Bok-joo, Rebel: Thief Who Stole the People, Secret Mother and Arthdal Chronicles. He is also known for participating in Hybe Labels Japan's reality show &AUDITION - The Howling.

Filmography

Films

TV series

TV shows

References

External links
 
 

2007 births
Living people
21st-century South Korean male actors
South Korean male child actors
South Korean male television actors
South Korean male film actors
People from Seoul